The American International School – Riyadh (AIS-R) (previously known as American Preparatory School of Riyadh, RICS and SAIS-R is an independent, non-profit, K-12, coeducational day school following an American-based curriculum with a focus on international perspectives. The IB Diploma Program is also offered in the high school. The school was established in 1963 and is located in the kingdom's capital, Riyadh.

Overview and history
Governed by a strategic Board of Trustees, the American International School – Riyadh is an independent, non-profit, co-educational school offering an enriched American curriculum with a focus on global citizenship for students from pre-Kindergarten to Grade 12. Founded in 1963, AIS-R is currently in its 60th year, on a purpose-built campus in north Riyadh. AIS-R offers the International Baccalaureate (IB) Diploma, and is accredited by both the New England Association of Schools and Colleges (NEASC) and the Council of International Schools (CIS). Additionally, AIS-R has been awarded International Certification with the Council of International Schools (CIS), a program designed to enhance intercultural skills, attitudes, and understandings of the global citizens.

The school that is known today as the American International School – Riyadh (AIS-R) has a well-established history in Riyadh. It was first formed by parents in 1963 and served students from kindergarten through third grade with only seven students enrolled. In 1965, what was previously called APS merged with a Ford Foundation school to form the Riyadh International Community School (RICS). As the capital of Riyadh grew between 1965–74, so too did the school's student body. Between 1974-79, RICS' enrollment increased rapidly from 400 students to more than 1,500. In 1977, after several moves to accommodate increasing enrollment, the school opened on its next site in South Riyadh. In 1982, the school name was changed again, this time to the Saudi Arabian International School - Riyadh (SAIS-R). The school has grown considerably since its inception, however, its peak enrollment of 2,750 students occurred in the 1984-85 school year. Today, on the school's new campus, enrollment is near capacity with more than 1600 students from more than 55 nations. With the school's growth in enrollment came the expansion of curriculum, facilities, services, programs, and grade levels. The school name was once again changed to its present name - AIS-R - in 1999. In 2014 AIS-R moved to its new campus in the northern region of Riyadh. The campus was built in cooperation with Al Bustan Village (a 1200 unit western - residential compound).

Academic program
AIS-R provides a college preparatory educational program in the English language and offers both the U.S. High School Diploma and the International Baccalaureate Diploma Program (DP). A majority of High School students undertake the full IB Diploma. All students take internal examinations and some take DP courses and sit for external examinations. AIS-R's school year consists of two semesters beginning in September and ending in mid-June. 

Students enroll in a maximum of eight courses using a 4 X 4 block alternating Day 1/Day 2 schedule and all classes are 75 minutes in length (IB HL classes meet for an average of 95 minutes per block within this schedule). One-half credit is awarded for the successful completion of each semester course with a passing mark of D−. Graduation requirements include a minimum of 24 credits including 12.5 hours of community service for each year at AIS-R both of which are indicated on the transcript. 

Higher Level and Standard Level IB Diploma Program courses include English Language and Literature A, Arabic B, French B, Spanish B, Biology, Chemistry, Physics, Mathematics, Visual Arts, Theater, Global Politics, Economics, and Business and Management.

Math Studies and the Nature of Science are offered at the Standard Level only. 100% of AIS-R teachers are licensed and certified to instruct in all U.S. Diploma courses and IBDP courses.

Facilities
Facilities include more than 100 classrooms, 2 dining halls, 2 gymnasiums, 2 soccer fields, tennis courts, running track, 2 Learning Commons, a 650-seat theater, art gallery Broadcast Journalism Studio, Dance Studio, 4 STEM labs, 12 science labs, 3 fully integrated computer labs, 3 mobile laptop stations, Eagle's Nest Store and Cafe, Parent Lounge, Subway, Za3tarino, Seattle's Best Coffee, juice bar, salad bar, gardens, covered courts, and playgrounds.

Faculty and students
AIS-R's organization consists of 119 faculty, 60 educational assistants, and support staff. Of AIS-R's faculty, 72 are from the U.S., 31 are from Canada, and the remaining 17 are primarily from Europe, Australia, and New Zealand and mainly from Saudi Arabia and the Middle East. Faculty members hold bachelor's degrees, credentials, and teaching licenses in their subject areas; 77 have also earned a masters, and 5 have obtained a doctorate. AIS-R's current enrollment is about 1,400 students.

See also
Yara International School

References

External links

 

Private schools in Saudi Arabia
International schools in Riyadh
Riyadh
Educational institutions established in 1963
1963 establishments in Saudi Arabia